Castletown Liam Mellows Gaelic Athletic Association is a Gaelic football and ladies' Gaelic football club based in Castletown, County Wexford, Ireland.

History
Castletown Liam Mellows are named for the Irish revolutionary Liam Mellows (1892–1922), who is buried in Castletown; his mother was from nearby Inch. They were founded in 1886. They won nine county titles between 1965 and 1981, but then suffered a drought until 2010. They won again in 2019 and 2022, putting them top of the all-time list.

Honours

Gaelic football
 Wexford Senior Football Championship (12): 1965, 1966, 1969, 1970, 1973, 1976, 1978, 1979, 1981, 2010, 2019, 2022
 Wexford Junior Football Championship (1): 1960

Hurling
Wexford Intermediate Hurling Championship (1): 1967
Wexford Junior Hurling Championship (1): 1964

Notable players
Ben Brosnan
Anthony Masterson

References

Gaelic football clubs in County Wexford
Hurling clubs in County Wexford
Gaelic games clubs in County Wexford